National Highway 160C, commonly referred to as NH 160C is a national highway in India. It is a secondary route of National Highway 60.  NH-160C runs in the state of Maharashtra in India.

Route 
NH160C connects Rahuri, and Shani Shingnapur in the state of Maharashtra.

Junctions  
 
  Terminal near Rahuri.
  Terminal near Shingnapur.

See also 
 List of National Highways in India
 List of National Highways in India by state

References

External links 

 NH 160C on OpenStreetMap

National highways in India
National Highways in Maharashtra